Thomas Weber (born 29 April 1974) is German-born history professor and university lecturer. Since 2013 he has been Professor of History and International Affairs at the University of Aberdeen.

Life

From 1986 to 1993, Thomas Weber attended the Anne Frank High School in Halver, Germany. From 1993 to 1996 Weber studied History, English and Law at the University of Münster, and from 1996 to 1998 Modern History at the University of Oxford, where he earned his Ph.D in history in 2003 under the supervision of Niall Ferguson. He held fellowships or taught at Harvard University for several years, as well as at the Institute for Advanced Study in Princeton, New Jersey, the University of Pennsylvania, the University of Chicago and the University of Glasgow. He took a teaching position at the University of Aberdeen in September 2008.
The focus of his research and teaching expertise lies in European, international, and global political history.
 
Since 2010 he has been the founding Director of the Center for Global Security and Governance at the University of Aberdeen, and since 2013 Professor of History and International Affairs. From 2012 to 2013 he was a Fritz-Thyssen-Fellow at the Weatherhead Center for International Affairs at Harvard University. Since 2013, he has been a guest researcher at the Center for European Studies at Harvard University.

Legacy
For years, various producers have attempted to adapt Weber’s 2010 Hitler’s First War into a TV mini-series. Currently, this project is being considered by the Berlin-based UFA-Fiction and Beta Film as a limited 10-episode series. Simply called Hitler, the TV series will trace Hitler’s life beginning as a soldier in World War I to his rise to power.

Awards

 The 2004 Golden Light Award in the category of “Best Edited Historical Book” for his first book, Lodz Ghetto Album
 The 2005 Infinity Award in the category of "Publication" for the International Center of Photography for Lodz Ghetto Album
 The 2008 Duc d’Arenberg History Prize for the best book on European history and culture for his second book Our Friend “The Enemy”
 The 2010 recipient of the 2010 Arthur Goodzeit Book Award of the New York Military Affairs Symposium for the best book on military history for his third book, Hitler's First War

Books

 Lodz Ghetto Album: Photographs by Henryk Ross, edited by Timothy Prus and Martin Parr, foreword by John Jan van Pelt, published by Chris Booth, London, 2004,  .
 Our Friend "The Enemy": Elite Education in Britain and Germany before World War I, Stanford University Press, Stanford, CA, 2008,  .
 Hitler's First War. Adolf Hitler, the Men of the List Regiment, and the First World War, Oxford University Press, Oxford, UK, 2010,  .
 Hitler 's First War. The Corporal Hitler in the World War - Myth and Truth, Propylaea, Berlin, 2011, (German translation)  ; Paperback: List, Berlin 2012,  
 Wie Adolf Hitler zum Nazi wurde, Berlin, 2016, (German edition) . English-language edition, Becoming Hitler: the Making of a Nazi, was published in 2017 by Basic Books and by Oxford University Press, .
  Becoming Hitler: The Making of a Nazi, 2017, Basic Books .

References

Academics of the University of Aberdeen
21st-century German historians
Historians of fascism
People from Hagen
Living people
1974 births